John L. Murray (January 25, 1806 – January 31, 1842) was a U.S. Representative from Kentucky.

Born in Pennsylvania, Murray studied law and was admitted to the bar.
He moved to Kentucky and held several local offices.
He served three terms in the Kentucky House of Representatives 1830–1835.

Murray was elected as a Democrat to the Twenty-fifth Congress (March 4, 1837 – March 3, 1839).
He died in Wadesboro, Kentucky, January 31, 1842.
He was interred in Irvin Cemetery.

Murray, Kentucky - a town in the southwest portion of the state - was named in honor of him.

References

1806 births
1842 deaths
Democratic Party members of the Kentucky House of Representatives
Democratic Party members of the United States House of Representatives from Kentucky
19th-century American politicians